The 1954 Tipperary Senior Hurling Championship was the 64th staging of the Tipperary Senior Hurling Championship since its establishment by the Tipperary County Board in 1887. The championship began on 22 August 1954 and ended on 3 October 1954.

Borris-Ileigh were the defending champions.

On 3 October 1954, Holycross-Ballycahill won the championship after a 6-05 to 2-03 defeat of Roscrea in the final at Thurles Sportsfield. It was their third championship title overall and their first title since 1951.

Qualification

Results

Semi-finals

Final

References

Tipperary
Tipperary Senior Hurling Championship